The inaugural U.S. National Championship was a tennis tournament that took place in August 1881 at the Newport Casino, Newport, Rhode Island and in that first year only clubs that were members of the United States National Lawn Tennis Association were permitted to enter the tournament. A Men's Singles competition and a Men's Doubles competition were played, and Richard Sears became the first men's singles U.S. National Tennis Champion.

Finals

Singles

 Richard Sears defeated  William E. Glyn 6–0, 6–3, 6–2

Doubles

 Clarence Clark /  Fred Taylor defeated  Arthur Newbold /  Alexander Van Rensselaer, 6-5, 6-4, 6-5

External links
Official US Open website

 
U.S. National Championships
U.S. National Championships (tennis) by year
U.S. National Championships (tennis)
History of tennis
U.S. National Championships (tennis)
U.S. National Championships (tennis)
U.S. National Championships (tennis)